Outro is the eleventh extended play by South Korean boy band, Highlight, released on November 20, 2018, by Around Us Entertainment and distributed by Kakao M. The album features vocals from member Doojoon, who previously enlisted on August 23, 2018, and is also the last Highlight release to feature member Junhyung, who would depart on March 14, 2019, as a witness in the Burning Sun scandal.

The album was preceded by the single, "Take Care," on October 29, 2018. The title track, "Loved," was released on November 20, 2018, alongside the album.

Background
Highlight released their single, "Take Care," on October 29, 2018. The group had their final broadcast before enlistment on You Hee-yeol's Sketchbook on November 2, 2018, after which Around Us Entertainment announced that they would be releasing a "special album," in the form of an extended play, which would include a track with Doojoon, recorded pre enlistment.

Promotion
The album was promoted through an eponymous solo concert, held on November 24 and 25.

Reception
Outro was met with positive reviews, with a peak chart of #4 on the GAON, and over 47,000 copies sold. Billboard described the album as a "poignant album," describing title track, "Loved," as "an evocative dance track that blends Highlight's reflective vocals with rhythmic strings, and is dominated by a bright, EDM choral drop with soaring violin riffs," while also comparing it to their earlier songs, saying "The darker vibes recall some of the act’s earlier songs like 2014’s “12:30” and 2016’s “Ribbon,” both released as BEAST, emphasizing their tender vocals and affinity for dance music all in one."

Tracklist

References

External links 

2018 EPs
Korean-language EPs
Kakao M EPs
Highlight (band) EPs